The 2008–09 season of the Israeli Futsal League was the 3rd season of top-tier futsal under the Israel Football Association and 9th overall. The regular season started on 16 December 2008 and was concluded on 31 March 2009. The championship playoffs began on 7 April 2009 with semi-finals series and concluded with the championship final series from 6–14 May.

Hapoel Ironi Rishon LeZion were the defending champions but lost the title by losing to Yanshufei Agudat Sport Tel Aviv on goal difference in the 2008–09 Championship Final series.

Regular season table

Playoffs

Calendar

Bottom play-offs

Championship play-offs

External links
Israeli Futsal League 2008-2009 IFA

References

Israeli Futsal League
Futsal
Israel